Vallotti temperament (or simply Vallotti, Vallotti-Barca, or Vallotti-Tartini) is a slightly modified version of a circulating temperament devised by the 18th-century organist, composer, and music theorist, Francesco Vallotti.

Vallotti's description of his temperament appears in book 2 of his treatise, Della scienza teorica e pratica della moderna musica  (On the theoretical and practical science of modern music). Although Vallotti stated that he had developed his theoretical system—presumably including the details of his temperament—by 1728, the first book of his treatise was not published until 1779, the year before he died.  At the time of his death, the other three books had not been published, and remained only in manuscript form until an edition of all four books was published in 1950, under the title Trattato della moderna musica (Treatise on modern music).

Vallotti's temperament received very little attention during his lifetime and for some time thereafter. In a treatise published in 1754, Vallotti's friend and colleague Giuseppe Tartini praised the former's approach to temperament, and outlined some of its features, but without giving sufficient detail for the temperament itself to be identified. In 1781, the mathematician William Jones noted Tartini's preference for Vallotti's temperament, and gave a similarly vague and unspecific description.

The temperament today attributed to Vallotti is not quite the same as the one he originally described. In the modern version, the odd fifth out in Vallotti's original is sharpened by a full schisma, and each of the six tempered fifths is flattened by a further  of a schisma. More recently, the tuning and keyboard construction expert, Owen Jorgensen, has proposed a version of Vallotti's temperament in which the beating frequencies of the tempered fifths, rather than their sizes, are chosen to be equal. In practice, none of these four versions is audibly distinguishable from any of the others, because no interval in any of them differs from the corresponding interval in any of the other three by as much as 2 cents.

Description

In the modern version of Vallotti's temperament, each of the fifths B-F, F-C, C-G, G-E, E-B, and B-F are perfectly just, while the fifths F-C, C-G, G-D, D-A, A-E, and E-B are each  of a Pythagorean (ditonic) comma narrower than just. The exact and approximate numerical sizes of these fifths, in cents, are given by:

If  sj  fj − 600  for  j = 1,2, the sizes of the major thirds in this temperament are:

The following table gives the pitch differences in cents between the notes of a chromatic scale tuned with this temperament and those of one tuned with equal temperament, when the note A of each scale is given the same pitch.

In Young's second temperament, however, the sequence of tempered fifths starts from the note C, rather than from F, as they do in Vallotti's temperament.

Other versions

Vallotti's original
This left the remaining fifth, B-F, narrower than just by a schisma. The exact and approximate numerical sizes of these latter fifths, in cents, are given by:

If  s1  is defined as above, and  sj  fj − 600  for  j = 3,4, the sizes of the major thirds in this temperament are:

The following table gives the pitch differences in cents between the notes of a chromatic scale tuned with this temperament and those of one tuned with equal temperament, when the note A of each scale is given the same pitch.

Barca's suggested modification
The exact and approximate numerical size of these fifths, in cents, is given by:

If  s3  is defined as above, and  s5  f5 − 600, the sizes of the major thirds in this temperament are:

The following table gives the pitch differences in cents between the notes of a chromatic scale tuned with this temperament and those of one tuned with equal temperament, when the note A of each scale is given the same pitch.

Jorgensen's version with equal-beating fifths
One of the leading experts on keyboard construction and tuning, Owen Jorgensen, contended that tempering fifths by precisely the same amount on keyboards—with the possible exception of the organ—was beyond the capabilities of tuning practices used before the twentieth century, and that the vast majority of keyboard tuners, when tuning by ear before the development of twentieth century tuning techniques, would have judged two adjacent or overlapping fifths to be the same whenever they beat at the same rate.

Jorgensen gave two sets of instructions for tuning Valotti's temperament in a way which he considered representative of what he believed would have been the results achieved by 18th- and 19th-century tuners.  The first used a bearing plan for the octave F3 to F4, the second, a bearing plan for the higher octave, F4 to F5.  In the first, middle C (C4) is tuned to a standard pitch of  Hz, all octaves, and the fifths B–F, F–C, C–G, E–B and B–F are tuned just, while the fifths , C3–G3, G3–D4, D3–A3, A3–E4, and E3–B3 are tuned narrow, all with a beat rate of 1.1 Hz.  The amounts by which these tempered fifths are narrow range from 2.9 cents for A–E to 4.9 cents for C–G, and average to 3.8 cents, slightly less than a sixth of the Pythagorean comma. As a consequence, the diminished sixth G–E, which is required to be a perfectly just fifth in Vallotti proper, turns out to be tempered narrow by 0.6 cents in this version of Jorgensen's.  The sizes of its major thirds in cents are:

The following table gives the pitch differences in cents between the notes of a chromatic scale tuned with Jorgensen's equal-beating version of Vallotti temperament and those of one tuned with equal temperament, when the note C4 of each scale is given the same pitch,  Hz.

Notes

References

Musical temperaments